Lauretta Hanson (born 29 October 1994) is an Australian professional racing cyclist, who currently rides for UCI Women's WorldTeam .

Career
In January 2018, Hanson was selected in the Korda-Mentha Australian cycling team to race the Women's Tour Down Under, the Women's Herald Sun Tour and the Cadel Evans Great Ocean Road Race.

Personal life
In August 2020, Hanson was studying a Bachelor of Business (Sports Management) at Deakin University.

Major results

2015
 1st Mildred Kugler Women's Open
 2nd Overall Tour of America's Dairyland
1st Stages 5 & 9
 5th Overall Armed Forces Association Cycling Classic
 5th White Spot / Delta Road Race
2016
 10th Overall Women's Tour Down Under
1st Young rider classification
 10th Overall Ladies Tour of Qatar
2017
 3rd Winston-Salem Cycling Classic
2018
 7th Overall Tour de Feminin-O cenu Českého Švýcarska
1st Stage 3 (ITT)
 7th Chrono Gatineau
 8th Road race, National Road Championships
 8th Grand Prix Cycliste de Gatineau
2019
 4th Le Samyn des Dames
2021
 3rd Road race, National Road Championships

See also
 List of 2016 UCI Women's Teams and riders

References

External links
 
 

1994 births
Living people
Australian female cyclists
Cyclists from South Australia
20th-century Australian women
21st-century Australian women